State funerals in Canada are public events held to commemorate former governors general, prime ministers, other members of the cabinet who died in office, and, at the cabinet's discretion, other eminent Canadians. With ceremonial, military, and religious elements incorporated, state funerals are offered and executed by the governor general-in-council, who provides a dignified manner for the Canadian people to mourn a national public figure. Provincial and territorial governments may also perform state funerals for citizens in their particular jurisdictions. However, most state funerals are federal affairs.

As Canada shares the person of its monarch with the other Commonwealth realms, funerals for Canada's former sovereigns, as well as for their consorts, typically take place in the monarch's oldest and most populous realm, the United Kingdom. In Canada, a commemoration service will be conducted by the federal crown-in-council and sometimes by provincial crowns, as well.

Process
State funerals are not required by any law and the family of the deceased may opt not to have such an event take place. Should the family agree to a state funeral, the Department of Canadian Heritage (DCH) will work in close consultation with them, as well as with other government departments and elements of the private sector, the degree of involvement depending on the size and complexity of the event. Similarly, the timeline varies on a case-by-case basis, most lasting between five and six days, during which the national flag is flown at half-mast on the Peace Tower on Parliament Hill in Ottawa and at other federal crown-owned installations across the country.

A formal statement issued by the governor general-in-council is typically broadcast by the media to notify the general public of an upcoming state funeral, while the DCH issues invitations according to the order of precedence, with foreign heads of state and government included.

Meanwhile, in the days leading up to the funeral, the body is transported from the place of death to Ottawa, whereupon the casket is met by a guard of honour—drawn from the Governor General's Foot Guards for a former governor general and from the Royal Canadian Mounted Police for a former prime minister, other ministers, or honoured individuals—and escorted by it to the Centre Block of the parliament buildings. There, the remains lie in state for a period of two days, with four members of the accordant guard of honour maintaining a constant vigil; for the remains of governors general, this takes place in the Senate chamber, in the Hall of Honour for those of prime ministers, and in other rooms for other individuals. On both days, designated hours are set for public viewing. The coffin is then escorted from the Centre Block to a waiting hearse as a gun salute is fired; 21 guns for a governor general, 19 guns for a prime minister, and 15 guns for others. The casket is then either transported to another location in the country for further memorials or to the place of burial.

State funeral memorial services are typically held in churches. The choice of host church is dependent on the religious faith of the deceased. However, since 1968, all state funerals held in Ottawa have included a service at the Anglican Church of Canada's Christ Church Cathedral; its five state funerals are the most of any venue. Three other churches have hosted two state funerals: All Saints Anglican Church, Notre-Dame Cathedral Basilica, and St Andrew's Presbyterian Church, all in Ottawa. The state funeral of Jack Layton, held in 2011 at Roy Thomson Hall in Toronto, is the only Canadian state funeral to have been held outside of a church.

Similar to a state funeral is a commemoration ceremony, which is a religious and/or memorial service to mark the passing of Canada's monarch or a royal consort (both of whom typically have their state funerals in the United Kingdom), an individual from a family that did not wish a state funeral, or a foreign dignitary. For instance, a commemoration ceremony was held in Ottawa in 2002 for the death of Queen Elizabeth, the Queen Mother, the consort of King George VI. A service was held in 2013 for Nelson Mandela, the former President of South Africa. Nevertheless, these commemorations may be classified as state funerals by the Canadian government. Provinces will also conduct their own commemoration ceremonies for the passing of the country's sovereign or a royal consort.

Not all who lie in state at parliament, nor all for whom flags are flown at half-mast, receive a state funeral. The exception was made for the funeral of Retired Sergeant Ernest Smith, the last living Canadian recipient of the Victoria Cross from the Second World War.

History

The first state funeral in Canada was held for Thomas D'Arcy McGee after his assassination in April 1868. The first Governor General of Canada to receive a state funeral was the Lord Tweedsmuir in 1940, who died in office. Sir John A. Macdonald, Canada's first prime minister was also the first to receive a state funeral.  Jack Layton was the first Leader of Her Majesty's Loyal Opposition who was not also a former prime minister to be honoured with a state funeral; after lying in state in the foyer of the House of Commons, the funeral service took place at Roy Thomson Hall in Toronto.

To mark the passing of Queen Victoria in 1901, the federal crown-in-council  arranged for gun salutes to take place on Parliament Hill, in the national capital, as well as at armouries across the country. The day of her funeral in the United Kingdom, 2 February, was declared a national day of mourning. When Victoria's son, King Edward VII died in 1910, his funeral date, 20 May, was set as a national holiday, during which military parades and tributes were held across the country.

The death of King George V was officially recognized on the day of his funeral in the UK, 28 January 1936, by a royal proclamation from Governor General the Lord Tweedsmuir, urging Canadians to attend church services and drape public buildings in black crepe. Between the King's death and his funeral, courthouses were closed. As George's successor, Edward VIII, abdicated his position as king of Canada by the end of 1936, no ceremonies marked his death in 1972. At the time, Edward's niece, then reigning as Queen Elizabeth II, received messages of condolence from her Governor General, Roland Michener, and Prime Minister, Pierre Trudeau, and her federal parliament passed a motion expressing sympathy. None made mention of the Duke’s previous role as Canada's king, only his time as Prince of Wales. Prime Minister Louis St Laurent laid a wreath at the Centre Block, in Ottawa, on 15 February 1952, the day of the burial of Edward's younger brother and Elizabeth's father, George VI. The day was an official holiday only in some provinces, while, in others, it was left to municipalities to decide how to commemorate the King.

When Queen Elizabeth II died on 8 September 2022, after a 70 year reign as Queen of Canada, the country immediately entered a period of official mourning. A federal holiday was declared for the funeral, while the provinces made a variety of arrangements for holidays.

A national commemoration ceremony for Elizabeth II took place at Christ Church Cathedral in Ottawa on 19 September, preceded by a parade of the Canadian Armed Forces and Royal Canadian Mounted Police through downtown Ottawa, as well as a 96-gun salute. Commemoration services took place in several provinces on the same day: in Alberta, British Columbia, Manitoba, New Brunswick, Newfoundland and Labrador, Nova Scotia, Prince Edward Island, and Saskatchewan. In Ontario, a memorial service was held in Toronto on 20 September. On the advice of his cabinet, the Lieutenant Governor of Quebec did not authorize any official service of remembrance.

List of state funerals in Canada

According to some sources Alexander Mackenzie did not have a state funeral.
McGee, Foster, Perley, and Flaherty were not sitting cabinet ministers at the times of their deaths. 
A state funeral was offered for assassinated Quebec cabinet minister Pierre Laporte in 1970 but his widow declined.
A state funeral was offered for Chief Justice Bora Laskin by Prime Minister Pierre Trudeau but his family declined.

List of national commemoration ceremonies in Canada

List of provincial state funerals in Canada

Alberta

Newfoundland and Labrador

Ontario

Quebec
State funerals in Quebec are reserved for former premiers. "National" funerals may be held for other distinguished Quebecers. Unlike state funerals, these are only partially subsidized by the government.

National funerals

List of provincial commemoration ceremonies in Canada

Alberta

British Columbia

Manitoba

New Brunswick

Newfoundland and Labrador

Nova Scotia

Ontario

Prince Edward Island

Saskatchewan

See also
 Death and state funeral of Pierre Trudeau
 Death and state funeral of Jack Layton

References